United Liberation Front may refer to:

 United Liberation Front of Assam, a separatist group in India
 United Liberation Front of Western South East Asia, an insurgent group in Northeast India
 Katarist United Liberation Front, a political party in Bolivia
 Tamil United Liberation Front, political party in Sri Lanka

See also 
 United National Liberation Front, a separatist group in Manipur, India
 United National Liberation Front (Paraguay), a Paraguayan resistance group
 United Liberation Forces, a Turkish expatriates' militia in the Syrian Civil War
 United Liberation Forces of Oromia, see Oromo people